Two ships of the Royal Navy have been named HMS Prince Albert, after Prince Albert, husband of Queen Victoria:

 HMS Prince Albert was to have been a 91-gun screw-propelled second rate.  She was renamed  before her launch in 1853 and was sold in 1872.
  was an iron screw turret ship launched in 1864 and sold in 1899.

See also:
  was a hired Belgian cross-Channel ferry, built in 1937, which served as a landing ship between 1941 and 1946.

References

Royal Navy ship names